Eteoryctis picrasmae is a moth of the family Gracillariidae. It is known from the islands of Hokkaidō and Honshū in Japan.

The wingspan is 7.6–10 mm.

The larvae feed on Picrasma quassioides. They mine the leaves of their host plant.

References

Acrocercopinae
Moths of Japan
Moths described in 1988